Benjamin Clement Eghan is a Ghanaian civil servant. He was Ghana's High Commissioner to Malaysia from 2013 to 2017,  and served as Secretary to the Cabinet from 2009 to 2013 in the John Atta-Mills administration. 
  
From 1993 to 2002, Eghan served in the rank of chief director in Ghanaian governmental ministries which include the Ministry of Environment, Science and Technology and the Ministry of Manpower and Employment. He was a Senior Lecturer and Dean of the GIMPA Public Services School before his recall into government service by president John Atta-Mills.

References 

Ghanaian civil servants
Living people
Year of birth missing (living people)